Herencia maldita (English title: Cursed inheritance) is a Mexican telenovela produced by Ernesto Alonso for Televisa in 1986.

Angélica María and Miguel Palmer starred as protagonists, while Manuel Ojeda and Liliana Abud starred as antagonists.

Plot 
Adela Beltrán is a woman who lives with her mother Elisa, who (through her addiction to gambling) ended up losing all the wealth that both received an inheritance. This forces Adela to try stealing in order to survive.

Cast 
 Angélica María as Adela Beltrán
 Miguel Palmer as Armando Rojas
 David Reynoso as Roberto Rojas
 Manuel Ojeda as Rogelio Velarde
 Liliana Abud as Clara Velarde
 Marco Muñoz as Antoine
 Emilia Carranza as Milagros
 Margarita Gralia as Laura
 Marcela de Galina as Susan
 Malena Doria as Virginia Roberto Antúnez as Rafael Susana Alexander as Elisa Rafael Amador as Raúl Luis Xavier as Phillipe Jorge del Campo as Enrique Fabio Ramírez as Manuel Maristel Molina as Rosa Alicia Montoya as Catherine Roberto Carrera as Vincent Nadia Haro Oliva as Janet Queta Lavat as Estela Angélica Vale as Adela Beltrán (child) Cristian Castro as Armando Rojas (child) José Antonio Ferral as Brown Sergio Jiménez as Arturo Villaseñor Ana Luisa Peluffo as Linda María Marcela as Susan''

Awards

References

External links 

1986 telenovelas
Mexican telenovelas
Televisa telenovelas
1986 Mexican television series debuts
1987 Mexican television series endings
Spanish-language telenovelas
Television shows set in Mexico